Angri is a town and comune in the province of Salerno, Campania, southern Italy.

History
The Byzantine general Narses defeated Teias, the last king of the Goths, nearby in AD 553.

In the 19th century, the city had a population of around 10,000 and its hinterland produced large quantities of grapes, tobacco, and cotton.

Angri was the native town of Gabriele Capone and Teresina Raiola, who emigrated to the United States and gave birth to Al Capone, a prominent gangster. Angri was also the hometown of Capone's successor of the Chicago Outfit, Frank Nitti, and of the Roman Catholic priest, Blessed Alfonso Maria Fusco, whose feast is February 6.

Geography
Angri is a part of the Agro Nocerino Sarnese, near the Vesuvian area, and togheder Scafati is the extreme part of the Salerno Province. The communal territory is at the base of the Lattari's mountains in the heart of the Sarno's valley, the most fertile areas of Italy.

Climate
The climate is temperate, given the proximity of the sea. Summer is often hot with daytime temperatures in the low to mid 30s Celsius. Heavy downpours are common in winter, often accompanied by moderate winds. Frosts and snow are rare.

Main sights

Sights in the city include the Castle and Doria's palace, the town park (the garden of the palace).

The churches are: the Collegiate Church of St. John the Baptist, the brotherhood of Santa Margherita, the church of Santa Maria of Constantinople, the former Grange of the Certosa di San Giacomo di Capri Pizzauto, the church of Santissima Annunziata with the museum of the Blessed can . Fusco, the Carmelite church, St. Catherine, St. Benedict, the brotherhood of Santa Margherita, the chapel of St. Cosmas and Damian.

Transport
Angri is connected to the Autostrada A3 motorways.
Angri station is the railway station of the city that allows moving to Naples and Salerno.

Sport 

The city's main football team is U.S. Angri Calcio 1927 A.S.D.

Basketball teams include:
 A.S.D Angri Basket
 Polisportiva A. Negro Angri basket
 Polisportiva S.C.A. Basket 2009

References

Sources
 .
Istituto Nazionale di Statistica. 2001 Census Data. 

Cities and towns in Campania